Chalambar may refer to:
 Chalambar, Ardabil
 Chalambar, Qazvin